Enrico Cardoso Nazaré (born 4 May 1984, in Belo Horizonte), commonly known as Enrico, is a former Brazilian footballer.

Playing career 
Enrico played for the Brazilian teams Atlético Mineiro and Ipatinga before his transfer to the Swedish team Djurgårdens IF, in the summer of 2006 on a 3.5 year contract. Enrico moved back to Brazil in 2009, hired by Vasco da Gama. During almost six years in Brazil, he played as well for Coritiba, Ceará and Ponte Preta. In the summer of 2014 Enrico went to Europe again, first to Greece where he defended Apollon Smyrni and Iraklis Psachna, and then to Sweden, defending Huddinge and Enskede. In 2017 Enrico ended his football career and started working as an agent.

Career statistics

Honours 
Ipatinga
Campeonato Mineiro (1): 2005

Vasco da Gama
Brazilian Série B (1): 2009
Brazilian Cup (1): 2011

Coritiba
Campeonato Paranaense (1): 2010
Brazilian Série B (1): 2010

References 

1984 births
Living people
Brazilian footballers
Brazilian expatriate footballers
Clube Atlético Mineiro players
Djurgårdens IF Fotboll players
CR Vasco da Gama players
Coritiba Foot Ball Club players
Ceará Sporting Club players
Apollon Smyrnis F.C. players
Associação Atlética Ponte Preta players
Campeonato Brasileiro Série A players
Campeonato Brasileiro Série B players
Allsvenskan players
Association football midfielders
Expatriate footballers in Sweden
Expatriate footballers in Greece
Huddinge IF players
Enskede IK players
Footballers from Belo Horizonte